Joseph Dion Ngute (born 12 March 1954) is a Cameroonian politician currently serving as the 9th Prime Minister of Cameroon, following his appointment in January 2019. He succeeded Philémon Yang, who had held the post since 2009.

Career
Ngute was born in southwest Cameroon, in Bongong Barombi. From 1966 to 1971, he studied at the Lycée Bilingue de Buéa, where he obtained the A-Level from the General Certificate of Education Advanced Level. From 1973 to 1977, he attended graduate school at the University of Yaoundé and obtained a law degree. Then, from 1977 to 1978, he enrolled at Queen Mary University in London, where he obtained a master's degree in law. And, from 1978 to 1982, he followed the Ph.D. program in law at the University of Warwick in the United Kingdom.

Since 1980, he has been a professor at the University of Yaoundé II. In 1991, he served as the director of the Advanced School of Administration and Magistracy. In 1997, he entered government, serving as the Minister Delegate to the Minister of External Relations. In March 2018 he was appointed Minister of special duties at the Presidency of the Republic.

Prime Ministership 

Ngute was appointed Prime Minister in 2019.

Personal life
Ngute comes from the English-speaking southwestern region of Cameroon (former Southern Cameroons), and is also a local tribal chief.

References

1954 births
Alumni of the University of Warwick
Prime Ministers of Cameroon
Cameroon People's Democratic Movement politicians
Living people
20th-century Cameroonian politicians
21st-century Cameroonian politicians